The small rufous horseshoe bat (Rhinolophus subrufus) is a species of bat in the family Rhinolophidae. It is endemic to the Philippines on the island of Camiguin, Catanduanes, Luzon, Mindanao and Mindoro at elevations from sea level to 1,000m.

References

Rhinolophidae
Mammals of the Philippines
Mammals described in 1905
Endemic fauna of the Philippines
Fauna of Luzon
Fauna of Mindanao
Fauna of Mindoro
Fauna of Camiguin
Fauna of Catanduanes
Taxa named by Knud Andersen
Taxonomy articles created by Polbot
Bats of Southeast Asia